Futebol Clube do Porto, commonly referred to as FC Porto or simply Porto, is a Portuguese professional handball team based in Porto. Created in 1932, it is the senior representative side of the handball section of multi-sports club FC Porto. 

The team competes domestically in the top-tier league Andebol 1 and internationally in European Handball Federation club competitions, such as the EHF Champions League and the EHF Cup. It plays its home matches at the Dragão Arena, alongside the club's basketball and roller hockey teams, and is managed by Swedish head coach Magnus Andersson.

History
The section started in 1932 with a field handball (eleven-a-side) team, which played competitive matches until 1974–75, when it was discontinued in favour of seven-a-side handball. During this period, the club won 37 regional and 29 national league titles in the field handball discipline.

In 1951, the club established the handball section whose team won the Portuguese league title for the first time in 1953–54, and increased that tally with eight further titles by 1968. Porto then endured a 31-year drought before winning the national league title again in 1998–99. In the 2014–15 season, the team secured their seventh consecutive league title, establishing a national record. In the previous season, the team also debuted in the EHF Champions League group stage, after overcoming the qualification tournament for the first time in five consecutive attempts.

Kits

Team

Current squad
The following players compose the squad for the 2022–23 season:

Goalkeepers 
 16  Nikola Mitrevski
 32  Sebastian Frandsen
 33  Diogo Rêma
Left wingers 
 21  Leonel Fernandes
 23  Diogo Branquinho
Right wingers 
 25  António Areia
 29  Miguel Alves
Line players 
4  Victor Iturriza
 15  Daymaro Salina
 17  Ignacio Plaza Jiménez 

Left backs 
2  Pedro Valdés
9  Pedro Cruz
 13  Nikolaj Læsø
 88  Fábio Magalhães
Central backs 
 10  Diogo Oliveira
 14  Rui Silva
Right backs 
7  Jakob Mikkelsen
 18  Jack Thurin
 19  Mamadou Diocou

Transfers
Transfers for the season 2023–24

Joining

Leaving
  Sebastian Frandsen (GK) (to  Fredericia HK)

Staff

Retired numbers

Honours
Porto is the most decorated Portuguese clubs in terms of domestic competitions, with a total of 43 national titles.

Domestic competitions
Portuguese League 
Winners (23) – record: 1953–54, 1956–57, 1957–58, 1958–59, 1959–60, 1962–63, 1963–64, 1964–65, 1967–68, 1998–99, 2001–02, 2002–03, 2003–04, 2008–09, 2009–10, 2010–11, 2011–12, 2012–13, 2013–14, 2014–15, 2018–19, 2020–21, 2021–22

Portuguese Cup
Winners (9): 1975–76, 1976–77, 1978–79, 1979–80, 1993–94, 2005–06, 2006–07, 2018–19, 2020–21

Portuguese League Cup
Winners (3) – record: 2003–04, 2004–05, 2007–08

Portuguese Super Cup
Winners (8) – record: 1994, 1999, 2000, 2002, 2009, 2014, 2019, 2021

European competitions
Limburgse Handbal Dagen
Winners (2): 2009, 2012

 Double
Winners (2): 2018–19, 2020–21

European record
Note: Porto's score is always listed first.

Notes

References

External links
 

FC Porto
Portuguese handball clubs